Obraztsov (masculine) or Obraztsova (feminine) is a Russian surname. Notable people with the surname include:

 Elena Obraztsova (1939–2015), Russian operatic mezzo-soprano
 Evgenia Obraztsova (also spelled Yevgenia Obraztsova) (born 1984), Russian prima ballerina
 Sergey Obraztsov (1901–1992), Russian Soviet puppeteer
 Vladimir Obraztsov (born 1940), Soviet sprint canoeist

See also
 4623 Obraztsova, main-belt asteroid named after Elena Obraztsova

Russian-language surnames